The WGN Morning News is an American morning television news program airing on WGN-TV (channel 9), an independent television station and national superstation in Chicago, Illinois owned by Nexstar Media Group. The program broadcasts each weekday from 4:00 to 10:00 a.m. and each weekend from 7:00 a.m. to 9:00 a.m.  Central Time.

The program is formatted as a newscast with a somewhat less serious tone than WGN-TV's other local news programs and is known for its fun and rambunctious nature, with the anchors and reporters often shown more relaxed on-air, often pulling on-air pranks and practical jokes. The 4:00–6:00 a.m. portion of the newscast is more staid in tone to some extent and is a more generalized news/weather/sports/traffic format, while the 6:00–10:00 a.m. portion incorporates feature segments, interviews and includes some humorous elements.

Since August 2014, hour-long weekend editions of the program have been aired on Saturday and Sunday mornings from 6:00 to 7:00 a.m., which is formatted more similarly to the station's midday and evening newscasts with a general news/weather/sports format. unlike WGN-TV's other newscasts, the weekend morning newscasts did not use a two-anchor format; on the weekend of September 10–11, 2016, WGN added an expansion to the weekend morning newscasts. Firstly, by adding a two-anchor format as WGN reporter Tonya Francisco joined Sean Lewis to head the weekend mornings, Mike Hammernik stayed with the newscast as weather presenter. Secondly, the scheduling of WGN's Weekend Morning News has moved from 6:00 to 7:00 a.m. and has expanded from 7:00 to 10:00 a.m. Saturdays and 7:00 to 9:00 a.m. Sundays, making the broadcast match with programs like the weekday versions of the midday and evening news.

History
Prior to the program's launch, WGN-TV had already carried morning newscasts; the station ran five-minute news briefs following its morning movie showcases on weekdays from the 1970s through the early 1990s. An attempt was made at a full-fledged morning newscast in May 1984, titled Chicago's First Report; replacing the agriculture-focused Top 'o' the Morning, First Report was canceled by December of that year thanks to low viewership. WGN would later debut full-fledged, hour-long newscasts on Saturdays and Sundays at 8 a.m. in early 1992. This was unusual considering the weekday morning newscast would not debut for another two years (television stations typically do not carry local news programming on weekend mornings without a weekday morning program already in place). At the time the weekend morning programs debuted, the station ran the long-running Chicago television staple The Bozo Show on weekday mornings. By 1994, WGN station management decided to get out of the weekday children's television business and moved The Bozo Show to Sunday mornings, revamping it as The Bozo Super Sunday Show on September 11 of that year. In its place, the station decided to launch a new weekday morning newscast; the WGN Morning News made its debut on September 6, 1994 (debuting on a Tuesday due to the occurrence of Labor Day one day earlier) as an hour-long newscast from 7-8 a.m.; it was originally anchored by Dave Eckert, Sonja Gantt and meteorologist Paul Huttner. Concurrent with the move of Bozo to Sundays, the Sunday morning newscast was cancelled.

Within a year-and-a-half of its debut, the WGN Morning News was gradually expanded in length: first to two hours (retaining its 7 a.m. start time) in January 1996; an additional hour at 6 a.m. was added eight months later in August 1996. That year, Larry Potash (who remains on the newscast to this day as anchor of the 6:00-10:00 a.m. block) replaced Eckert as co-anchor of the program. While the weekday morning newscast gained an audience, WGN-TV's lone weekend morning newscast on Saturday mornings was cancelled in December 1998, leaving only the flagship 9 p.m. newscast as WGN's only news program on weekends (outside of public affairs programs People to People, Adelante, Chicago and the since-discontinued Minority Business Report) for the next twelve years. In January 2001, the weekday newscast was expanded to 3½ hours, adding a half-hour at 5:30 a.m. and in January 2004, it was expanded to four hours starting at 5 a.m.

On August 16, 2010, WGN-TV added an additional half-hour to the newscast, which expanded to 4:30-9 a.m.; with the expansion into the 4:30 timeslot, WGN-TV became the third Chicago station to begin its morning newscast at that time, along with NBC-owned WMAQ-TV (which debuted the current incarnation of its 4:30 a.m. show in 2009, although it had an earlier newscast at that time as Barely Today in 2007), and ABC-owned WLS-TV (which debuted a newscast in that timeslot two weeks earlier). On October 2 of that year, WGN-TV re-entered into weekend morning news, with the launch of two one-hour newscasts on Saturday and Sunday mornings from 6:00 to 7:00 a.m. (the Saturday newscast airs in the early time slot for one hour due to The CW's morning animation block). The addition made WGN-TV the second Tribune-owned station to carry a weekend morning newscast (though the first chronologically due to its earlier weekend morning shows in the 1990s; Fox affiliate WXIN/Indianapolis debuted weekend morning newscasts in August 2010; Fox affiliate WTIC-TV/Hartford and fellow CW affiliate KTLA/Los Angeles would later join them in January and April 2011, respectively).

On July 11, 2011, the weekday edition of the WGN Morning News expanded once more with the addition of a half-hour at 4 a.m., bringing the program to a five-hour time length. This made it the first station in the Chicago market and the third Tribune station (after WPIX/New York City and WXIN) to have its weekday morning newscast start at 4 a.m. In March 2013, reports surfaced that WGN station management was considering expanding the weekday edition of the WGN Morning News to six hours – with an additional hour of the newscast being added from 9 to 10 a.m., once Live! with Kelly and Michael (which had aired locally on WGN-TV since September 2002) moved to WLS-TV in September. The news of this expansion was confirmed on June 20, 2013 through a report by media columnist and former Chicago Sun Times reporter Robert Feder on his Facebook page.

National carriage
From 1996 to 2014, the WGN Morning News did not regularly air on WGN-TV's national superstation feed WGN America, reportedly because certain segments of the newscast were not allowed to air outside of Chicago due to syndication exclusivity rules on segments within the newscast. The only instance where the WGN Morning News was carried nationally on WGN's superstation feed during this period was on September 12, 2001 as part of special coverage of the September 11th terror attacks on New York City and Washington, D.C. All of WGN's news programming (including the SyndEx-restricted segments, but excluding the video portions of highlight footage during sports segments) is streamed over the station's website and through WGN's smartphone applications.

WGN America restored a simulcast of the WGN Morning News to its schedule on February 3, 2014, airing only the first two hours of the broadcast, which replaced paid programming that occupied the 5:00–7:00 a.m. ET timeslot on the superstation feed (the addition concurred with the removal of the simulcast of WGN's 9 p.m. newscast, which was replaced by syndicated programming in that timeslot four days prior). WGN America restricted carriage of the program on December 15, 2014 to certain markets, with paid programming as a substitution in most others as a result of its transition to a basic cable network; because of this, WGN-TV's newscasts are now available worldwide only through the station's website, www.wgntv.com, and on television outside of the Chicago market via Canadian cable and satellite providers that carry the WGN-TV Chicago broadcast signal (WGN-TV is authorized for carriage in Canada by the Canadian Radio-television and Telecommunications Commission).

Segments
The 6 @ 6 

The 9 @ 9

The List

Around Town

Dean Cooks (Wednesdays)

I Want Your Text

And Now For Something Completely Hoover (Mondays)

Voicemail & Other Stuff

Courtesy Desk

What’s Happening

Trending with Marcus

Weather in a Minute

Dean’s Buzz (or The Buzz on days when Richards is absent)

Friday Forecaster (during the school year in Chicago)

Notable on-air personalities

Current personalities
 Dan Ponce – Co-anchor 4–6 a.m.
 Lauren Jiggetts - Co-anchor 4-6 a.m.
 Morgan Kolkmeyer -  Weather Anchor 4-6 a.m.
 Marcus Leshock – Trending reporter
 Sarah Jindra – Traffic reporter 
 Larry Potash – Co-anchor 6–10 a.m.
 Robin Baumgarten – Co-anchor 6–10 a.m.
 Paul Konrad – Weather Anchor 6–10 a.m.
 Pat Tomasulo – Sports Reporter 6–10 a.m.
 Dean Richards – entertainment reporter
 Ana Belaval – Around Town reporter
 Mike Toomey - Fill-in; Announcer 9-10 a.m.

The first 5 are known as "The B Team".

Former personalities
 Mike Barz – sports anchor (now at WISH-TV)
 Randy Salerno – reporter/substitute anchor (later at WBBM-TV in Chicago, died in 2008)
 Roseanne Tellez – co-anchor (later at WBBM-TV now co-anchor at WFLD)
 Bill Weir – sports anchor (now at CNN)
 Paul Huttner - meteorologist (now Chief Meteorologist at Minnesota Public Radio)
 Valerie Warner (now on WLS-TV's "Windy City Live")

See also
KTLA Morning News - a morning news and entertainment program on sister station KTLA in Los Angeles.

References

External links
Official page

Local news programming in the United States
1994 American television series debuts
WGN America original programming